Hey Brook is a watercourse in Rochdale, Greater Manchester and a tributary of the River Roch. It originates at the confluence of Buckley Brook and Syke Brook, and flows through Wardleworth to the River Roch.

Tributaries
Syke Brook
Buckley Brook
Fanny Brook
Clough House Brook
Nick Road Brook
Stid Brook
Knowl Syke Brook
Higher Slack Brook
Long Shoot Brook
Calf Brook
Copy Brook

Rivers of the Metropolitan Borough of Rochdale
1